Manuel Flores (Jose Manuel Nepomunceno Paublino Flores; ca. 1801–1868) served as a volunteer in the Texas army in 1835–1838. Fighting and commanding, he rose through the ranks to reach sergeant status during the fight for Texas independence and was commissioned a captain during the Republic years.

Family history – early years
Manuel Flores was born in Spanish Texas on June 16, 1799, in La Villa de San Fernando de Bexar. He was a skilled vaquero and ranchero that lived on the San Antonio River below San Antonio. He married Maria Josefa Courbière in 1835.  He married Margarita Garza in 1858.

He was the son of Jose Flores De Abrego and Maria Rodriquez  They were a prominent family of Bexar, rich in the ranching history of Texas and steeped in the cause of secession from Mexico.

Supporting the 1835–1836 Texas independence movement were four Flores De Abrego sons, Captain Salvador Flores Captain Manuel Flores, Lieutenant Nepomuceno Flores, and Private Jose Maria Flores, having participated in the Texas Revolution, serving at Bexar and San Jacinto. Manuel was the brother-in-law of Col. Juan Nepomuceno Seguín.

Texas Revolution

Battle of Gonzales

Anticipating the Battle of Gonzales, a meeting would be held late in September 1835 at the Flores Ranch, that would organize a volunteer force of Texas ranchers that would favor the impending revolution. In Gonzales, immigrants, colonists, and Texian volunteers continued gathering. The Texian Army would become a mixture of all peoples, interested in the cause of democracy. Manuel Flores would be in favor, and volunteer his services to Texas. Manuel Flores would be the courier to inform Stephen F. Austin that Juan N. Seguin's volunteer company would join in at Béxar, against General Cos.

Siege of Bexar
The attention of the commander of the Texian volunteer forces, Stephen F. Austin, now focused towards a Béxar campaign. Manuel and his brother, Salvador Flores, along with Manuel Leal, organized 41 volunteers from ranches southwest of San Antonio, where they reinforced the Texan forces on the Salado Creek, in mid-October, a few days after Juan Seguin and Plácido Benavides of Victoria had also gathered 70 men to aid Commander Stephen F. Austin. Manuel Flores entered the company with Juan Seguin elected as commander. In December 1835, after a two-month siege of Bexar, that finally ended in ferocious house-to-house fighting, Manuel Flores participated in the removal of Gen. Martín Perfecto de Cos at the Siege of Bexar.

Battle of the Alamo
Seguin stated that he brought 15 men into the Alamo along with him. Lindley believed that the Flores brothers were defending the Alamo some time near the beginning of the siege. Manuel and the volunteers entered the Alamo on February 23. His brother had been one of the 100 or so that had served at the Siege of Bexar and remained in the Alamo with Colonel James C. Neill. At some point later in the siege, after Seguin's departure as a courier, the Flores brothers exited the Alamo, thus making them survivors of the Alamo siege. In 1907, Alamo survivor Enrique Esparza stated that Santa Anna called an armistice for three days and he remembers the Flores brothers leaving at that time. They had entered the Alamo hastily when the Mexican army arrived and now they took the chance to check on the condition of their families, who had been left alone in their homes. After securing the safety of their families, they regrouped and recruited a few more men from the area, gaining a few more Flores brothers. They then rendezvoused with Seguin in Gonzales. There, the native Texan defenders were joined by other men from Gonzales and proceeded westward to reinforce the Alamo. There, on the Cibolo, they waited to team up with Fannin's army. Fannin never made it to the Cibolo, thus the Alamo fell before they could reach it.

Battle of San Jacinto
A company was reorganized in Gonzales during the first week of March 1836, and Manuel Flores became Captain Seguin's first sergeant. This force would now split up. Salvador Flores formed the western rear guard and would maintain this position offering protection from Mexican and Indian attack, while Sergeant Manuel Flores, with his brothers and brother-in-law gathered their company to follow Houston eastward. This company blocked the Mexican army from crossing the Brazos river, preventing them from overtaking the Texians. Sergeant Manuel Flores together with Captain Juan Seguin, Corporal Nepomuceno Flores, Private Jose Maria Flores and their Tejano company would then join in with Houston and Rusk to overtake Santa Anna's army, in the rout at the Battle of San Jacinto.

Manuel Flores is credited for taking the lead in the final charge against Santa Anna's army at San Jacinto. Although originally a cavalry company, they would fight with Sidney Sherman's force as infantry. José Maria Rodriquez states in his book Memoirs of Early Texas, that during the final charge, the Texans fired and fell to the ground waiting for a volley from the Mexican camp, but Manuel Flores remained standing and  challenged the Texican Army to "get up" and follow his lead, for the Mexicans were running. They got up and pursued the Army, taking many prisoners.

Republic of Texas
After the Texas Revolution, he was commissioned as first lieutenant in Company B of the Second Regiment of Cavalry.  Next he was commissioned the captain of a cavalry company in defense of the new republic, participating in much the same way a ranger company would. In 1838 he established a ranch on the south side of the Guadalupe River near a natural rock waterfalls and directly across from Seguin, Texas. Being one of the larger operating ranches of the time, it was visited in 1846 by German geologist Ferdinand von Roemer, who described the home and the Flores Falls in his works Die Kreidebildungen von Texas and ihre organischen Einschlüsse  (1852).

In 1842, San Antonio was overrun twice, by Santa Anna's forces. During March 1842, the citizens of San Antonio sought refuge at Manuel Flores Ranch in the city of Seguin, Texas. There, a counterattack was planned and Manuel Flores was a member of the party that pursued the army of Ráfael Vásquez. Even though his brother-in-law, Juan Seguin had also joined in the pursuit that chased the invaders from Texas, Seguin was doomed to be blamed for the invasion. The Flores ranch in Seguin would again become a base camp when General Adrian Woll attacked San Antonio in September 1842.

Legacy
In later years, the Flores descendants were the ones to donate the land for the establishment of the City in Texas that bears their name: Floresville, Texas.

A Texas State Historical Marker was placed at the Floresville courthouse during the 1986 Texas sesquicentennial. It now stands in honor to Manuel Flores and his family for their service to Texas.

Tejanos who served under Juan Seguín

See also

 List of Texas Revolution battles
 Timeline of the Texas Revolution
 Juan Seguin
 Salvador Flores

Notes

References

Sources

External links 

Handbook of Texas Online, s.v. ","  (accessed April 27, 2013).

1801 births
1868 deaths
People of Spanish Texas
Alamo defenders
Alamo survivors
People of the Texas Revolution
People from Floresville, Texas
Military personnel from San Antonio
People from Seguin, Texas
Tejano people